The Frog Rock is a rock in Hengchun Township, Pingtung County, Taiwan. The rock is part of Kenting National Park.

History
The rock is originally external rocks brought by Kenting argillite. The rocks were wrapped in it, but gradually became exposed and became an independent rock because of continuous erosion by wind and sea water.

Geology
The rock is 61 meters in height with the shape of a frog jumping into the sea. It is surrounded by various volcanic rock gravels.

See also
 Geology of Taiwan

References

Landforms of Pingtung County
Rock formations of Taiwan